Iohannis is both a surname and a given name. Notable people with the name include:

 Klaus Iohannis, the fifth president of Romania 
 Iohannis de Lignano, Italian jurist
 Iohannis de Serravalle, Italian Franciscan and humanist
 Iohannis Eckii, Latinized name of Johann Maier von Eck

See also
 Johannis (disambiguation)
 Ioannis
 Joannis
 Alternate forms for the name John